Juan Carlos Oblitas Saba (16 February 1951 in Mollendo, Arequipa) is a retired Peruvian footballer, who is a football manager, who is nicknamed El Ciego ("The Blind One"). Oblitas was an extraordinary outside left wing forward at the national team level for Peru back in the 1970s and 1980s.

Biography
Juan Carlos Oblitas, el Ciego, was born in Mollendo, Arequipa on 16 February 1951.
He is married to Virginia Villamarin and has three children (Gisella, Juan Fernando, and Vanessa). He has six grandchildren. His son Juan Fernando has three daughters: Paula, Ariana and Andrea.

As a player, he was a participant at the 1978 and 1982 FIFA World Cups. He obtained 64 international caps with Peru, and won the Copa América 1975. He played at the club level for Universitario and Sporting Cristal in Peru, as well as Elche in Spain, Veracruz in Mexico and R.F.C. Sérésien in Belgium.

As a manager, he won the Primera División Peruana national title with Universitario (1987) and Sporting Cristal (1994, 1995), as well as the Campeonato Ecuatoriano de Fútbol with Liga Deportiva Universitaria de Quito (2005). In the period 1996-99 he coached the Peru national football team, missing the 1998 World Cup finals on goal difference.

After Manuel Burga resigned following a long period of criticism, the new FPF leadership of Edwin Oviedo appointed him as technical director for the national team. There, in January 2017, he helped the new FPF leadership to design the "Minors Plan" project, with the aim to improve the youth football of Peru which has been weaker than most of other CONMEBOL nations, in order to rebuild and reform football development in Peru for the future. He also aimed to make Peru one of major youth football power in South America, hoping to achieve more frequent qualification to the FIFA U-17 and FIFA U-20 World Cups. He also helped designing the Centennial Plan 2022, with its goal is to achieve more World Cup qualification successes, and making the Peruvian youth league one of South America's strongest, as well as the construction of new FPF Academy, the Center of National Teams.  ->

Titles

As a player

As a manager

References

External links
 Oblitas on RSSSF-site

 

1951 births
Living people
People from Islay Province
Association football forwards
Peruvian footballers
Peru international footballers
Club Universitario de Deportes footballers
Elche CF players
C.D. Veracruz footballers
R.F.C. Seraing (1904) players
Sporting Cristal footballers
Peruvian Primera División players
La Liga players
Liga MX players
Belgian Pro League players
Peruvian expatriate footballers
Expatriate footballers in Spain
Expatriate footballers in Mexico
Peruvian expatriate sportspeople in Mexico
Expatriate footballers in Belgium
1975 Copa América players
1978 FIFA World Cup players
1982 FIFA World Cup players
1999 Copa América managers
Peruvian football managers
Peruvian Primera División managers
Club Universitario de Deportes managers
Sporting Cristal managers
Peru national football team managers
L.D. Alajuelense managers
Universidad San Martín managers
L.D.U. Quito managers
Copa América-winning players
Expatriate football managers in Costa Rica
Expatriate football managers in Ecuador